Harold Arthur Crouch (born 18 July 1940) is an Australian political science scholar and author. He has been described as "one of the pre-eminent scholars of Indonesian politics." Most of his books are published under "Harold Crouch".

Early and personal life
Harold Arthur Crouch was born on 18 July 1940 in Melbourne, Australia, at the Mercy Hospital. His parents, Marjorie Hilda Morris (Crouch) and Harold Crouch, were married in 1934 and lived in Elwood, Victoria, a suburb of Melbourne, at the time of his birth. He has a sister named Marjorie. In 1973 he married Khasnor Johan, a Malaysian historian.

Education
Crouch began his studies in political science at the University of Melbourne in 1958. William Macmahon Ball, the "foremost pioneer of Australia's relations with the newly independent countries of Asia", led the department at that time. Crouch received his bachelor's degree in political science from the University of Melbourne.

He studied for his master's degree at the University of Bombay in 1963–65 and in 1966 published his research on Indian trade unions. Crouch was one of the few Australian citizens studying in an Asian university at that time.

Crouch studied for his PhD in Indonesian studies at Monash University in Melbourne under the supervision of Herbert Feith who was at that time Australia's "pre-eminent scholar of Indonesian politics". While teaching at the University of Indonesia from 1968 to 1971, Crouch gathered information that would be used for his dissertation, which was completed in 1975. The subject of his research was Indonesian politics and the Indonesian army. In 1978 a revised version, The Army and Politics in Indonesia was published by Cornell University Press.

Career
From 1968 until 1971, Crouch taught political science in Jakarta at the University of Indonesia. He was from 1976 to 1990 a lecturer in political science at the National University of Malaysia. For one semester in 1983–1984 he taught at the University of the Philippines.

In 1991 he joined the Australian National University's Department of Political and Social Change, Research School of Pacific and Asian Studies in Canberra. His research as a senior research fellow centered on Southeast Asian politics. He was appointed as professor in 2002 and retired at the end of 2005.

Crouch founded the Jakarta office of the International Crisis Group in 2000–2001, after Soeharto's resignation. This led to the accumulation of information for his 2010 book, Political Reform in Indonesia after Soeharto published by the Institute of Southeast Asian Studies in Singapore.

Legacy
In the preface of their book Soeharto's New Order and its Legacy: Essays in honour of Harold Crouch, the authors write:

Published works
Crouch published works between 1964 and 2010 predominantly in English, but also in Indonesia and Dutch languages.

References

Academic staff of the Australian National University
Academic staff of the University of Indonesia
Academic staff of the National University of Music Bucharest
Academic staff of the University of the Philippines
Australian political scientists
Political science educators
Asian studies
1940 births
Living people
Indonesianists
Australian expatriates in India
Writers from Melbourne
People from Elwood, Victoria